Emil Marwa (born 1974) is a British actor, known for his acting in films like Izzat, East Is East, and The Guru.

Early life
His father is an Indian Kenyan Sikh and his mother is of Norwegian descent. Emil was brought up in London, England.

Awards

Selected filmography

References

External links

English male film actors
Male actors from London
1974 births
Living people
British male actors of Indian descent